Bret Jones (born December 8, 1980) is a former American soccer player.

Career

Youth and amateur
Jones attended Xenia High School and played college soccer at Wright State University from 1999 to 2001, being named to the All-Horizon League team as a senior. He subsequently played with Dayton Gemini and the Columbus Shooting Stars in the USL Premier Development League.

Professional
Jones turned professional in 2005 when he signed with the expansion franchise Cincinnati Kings in the USL Second Division. He made his professional debut on June 11, 2005, in a 0–0 tie with the Wilmington Hammerheads, and went on to play 11 games and score 1 goal in his debut season.

After a brief period playing professional indoor soccer with 1790 Cincinnati, and training with the Columbus Crew reserves, Jones signed with the Dayton Dutch Lions in the USL Premier Development League in 2010, scoring 2 goals in 10 games during the team's debut season. He continued with the team in 2011 when the team self-promoted to the USL Professional Division in 2011.

References

External links
 Dayton Dutch Lions profile

Living people
1980 births
American soccer players
Cincinnati Kings players
Columbus Shooting Stars players
Dayton Gemini players
Dayton Dutch Lions players
USL League Two players
USL Championship players
Wright State Raiders men's soccer players
Association football forwards